John Conyers (13 December 1717 – 8 September 1775) was a British Member of Parliament.

He was the eldest son of Edward Conyers, MP and was educated at University College, Oxford (1735). He succeeded his father in 1742, inheriting a somewhat dilapidated Copt Hall, near Epping, Essex, which he demolished and rebuilt.

He was a Tory member of the Parliament of Great Britain for Reading from 1747 to 1754 and for Essex from 25 February 1772 to 8 September 1775.

He married twice; firstly Hannah, the daughter of Richard Warner, of North Elmham, Norfolk and secondly his cousin, Lady Henrietta Frances, the daughter of Thomas Fermor, 1st Earl of Pomfret. They had 13 children, of whom 8 survived.

References

 

1717 births
1775 deaths
Alumni of University College, Oxford
Members of the Parliament of Great Britain for English constituencies
British MPs 1747–1754
British MPs 1768–1774
British MPs 1774–1780